Victoria Gardens may refer to:

Locations
 Victoria Gardens (Rancho Cucamonga), a retail center in Rancho Cucamonga, California, United States
 Victoria Gardens, Neath, a park in Neath, Wales
 Victoria Gardens, Portland, a park on the Isle of Portland, Dorset, England
 Victoria Gardens Shopping Centre, a shopping mall in Richmond, Victoria, Australia
 Jijamata Udyaan, formerly known as Victoria Gardens, a zoo and a garden in Byculla, Mumbai, India
 The original name of White Hart Field, Bromley, London

Music
 "Victoria Gardens", a song by the group Madness from the 1984 album Keep Moving

See also
 Victoria Garden City, a gated community in Lagos State, Nigeria
 Victoria Tower Gardens, a small park adjacent the Palace of Westminster
 Queen Victoria Gardens, Melbourne, Australia
 Royal Victoria Gardens, North Woolwich, London